Syllepte pactolalis is a moth in the family Crambidae. It was described by Achille Guenée in 1854. It is found on Guadeloupe and Rio de Janeiro, Brazil.

References

Moths described in 1854
pactolalis
Moths of the Caribbean
Moths of South America